Brett A. Weaver (born November 16, 1966, in Lafayette, Louisiana) is an American voice actor working with ADV Films, Funimation, OkraTron 5000, and Sentai Filmworks. He is known for his roles in the English-language dubs of anime series. He lives in Austin, Texas with his wife, cartoonist and graphic novelist E.K. Weaver.

Weaver got his start in radio before providing anime voice-over roles with ADV Films. He was also a member of a theatre group with fellow ADV alumni Chris Patton, Laura Chapman, Christine Auten, and Amanda Winn Lee.

Anime roles
 Attack on Titan - Gunther
 Attack on Titan: Junior High - Gunther
 Bubblegum Crisis Tokyo 2040 - Kane
 Burst Angel: Infinity - Commissioner
 Case Closed - Hamilton Timberman, Hadrian Timberman, Mark Newman (FUNimation dub)
 Casshern Sins - Tetsu (Ep. 11)
 Dark Warrior - Joe Takagami
 Dragon Half - Damaramu
 Evangelion: Death and Rebirth - Toji Suzuhara
 Excel Saga - Nabeshin
 Fire Emblem (anime) - Julian
 Full Metal Panic - Andy (Ep. 15)
 Fullmetal Alchemist: Brotherhood - Cremin
 Gantz - Akitoshi Okazaki, Koji Tachibana, Boyfriend (Episode 7)
 Gasaraki - Kiyoharu Gowa
 Godannar - Goh Saruwatari
 Gunsmith Cats - Jonathan Washington (debut)
 Gurren Lagann (ADV Dub) - Kamina Jiha
 Hakuōki: Dawn of the Shinsegumi - Kamo Serizawa
 Intrigue in the Bakumatsu - Irohanihoheto - H.S. Parkes, Shinzaemon Tatewaki
 Jing: King of Bandits - Vodka
 Ki*Me*Ra - Osamu
 Mardock Scramble: The Second Combustion - Ashley Harvest
 Martian Successor Nadesico - Gai Daigoji, Tsukomo Shiratori
 My Bride Is a Mermaid - Shibasaki (Ep. 5)
 Neon Genesis Evangelion - Toji Suzuhara (Ep. 25–26)
 Nerima Daikon Brothers - Rental Shop Guy
 New Cutie Honey - Akira/Devilman
 Nurse Witch Komugi - Nabeshin (ep. 4)
 One Piece - Morgan, Daz Bonez, Stansen (FUNimation dub)
 Phantom ~Requiem for the Phantom - Muroto (Ep. 14)
 Princess Nine - Ishimaru
 Puni Puni Poemi - Nabeshin
 Ruin Explorers - Gill; Miguel
 Samurai 7 - Syusai
 Slayers Special - Jeffery
 SoltyRei - Vincent Greco (Ep. 6)
 Sorcerer Hunters - Carrot
 Sorcerer on The Rocks - Genmi
 Spectral Force - Lead Hero
 Street Fighter II V - Ryu (ADV Dub-1st voice)
 Tears to Tiara - Cecil, Gaius
 The End of Evangelion - Toji Suzuhara
 The Super Dimension Fortress Macross - Roy Focker
 Ushio & Tora - Tora
 The Wallflower - Mysterious Voice/Nabeshin
 Witchblade (anime) - Akira Nakata
 Those Who Hunt Elves - Hammerhead
 Zone of the Enders - Hines

Other roles
 Smite - Default Announcer & VGS 
 Team Four Star's Hellsing Ultimate Abridged - Commander Violet

References

External links
 Big Big Truck Weaver's website.
 
 
 

1966 births
Living people
American male video game actors
American male voice actors
People from Lafayette, Louisiana
20th-century American male actors
21st-century American male actors